The Bolsøy Bridge is a concrete beam bridge in Molde Municipality, Møre og Romsdal county, Norway.  The bridge crosses the Bolsøysund strait between the mainland and the island of Bolsøya.  Bolsøy Bridge was opened in 1991 as part of County Road 64, and together with the Fannefjord Tunnel, they form a ferry-free connection from the town of Molde and the island of Bolsøya to the village of Nesjestranda on the mainland.

See also
List of bridges in Norway
List of bridges in Norway by length
List of bridges by length

References

Buildings and structures in Molde
Bridges in Møre og Romsdal
Bridges completed in 1991
Beam bridges
Norwegian County Road 64
1991 establishments in Norway